Dennis Thorley (born 7 November 1956) is an English former footballer who played in the Football League for Blackburn Rovers and Stoke City.

Career
Thorley was born in Stoke-on-Trent and joined local side Stoke City in 1976. He had his debut on the penultimate match day of the 1976–77 season against West Bromwich Albion with Stoke relegated on the final game to the Second Division. He made just one sub appearance in 1977–78 and in 1978–79 he spent a few months playing in the United States for Southern California Lazers. He then spent the end of 1979–80 season on loan at Blackburn Rovers under Howard Kendall where he made four appearances. In 1980–81 he played in 13 matches under Alan Durban but was forced to retire in 1982 with a serious knee injury aged 26.

Career statistics
Source:

References

English footballers
Stoke City F.C. players
Blackburn Rovers F.C. players
English Football League players
Living people
1956 births
Association football defenders